Dear... is a documentary television series created by R. J. Cutler. The series premiered on June 5, 2020 on Apple TV+.

Premise 
Dear... is inspired by the "Dear Apple" advertising campaign, where customers share stories about how Apple products have changed their lives. In the same vein, this docuseries features celebrities reading letters by people "whose lives have been changed through their work." Each episode focuses on one celebrity.

Episodes

Season 1 (2020)

Season 2 (2022–23)

Release 
In January 2020, Apple announced Dear..., to be executive produced by R. J. Cutler. The first season was released on June 5, 2020 on Apple TV+.

In March 2021, the series was renewed for a 9-episode second season, featuring Billy Porter, Malala Yousafzai, Laird Hamilton, Jane Fonda, Viola Davis, Sandra Oh, André Leon Talley, Ava DuVernay, and Kareem Abdul-Jabbar, to premiere March 4, 2022.

References

External links 
 

2020 American television series debuts
Apple TV+ original programming
2020s American documentary television series
English-language television shows
Works based on advertisements